The Moderates are a centrist political party in Italy, active mainly in Piedmont, but also in Lombardy, Emilia-Romagna, Campania and Sicily. The party, whose leader is Giacomo Portas, is associated with the centrist party Italia Viva.

History
The party was launched in January 2006 by Portas, a former member of Forza Italia (FI), and was joined by four regional councillors: Giuliano Manolino (ex-FI), Giovanni Pizzale (ex-IdV), Mauro Laus (ex-DS) and Graziella Valloggia (ex-PRC).

In the 2006 municipal election in Turin the party scored 4.0%, in 2007 it won 3.0% in Cuneo, 7.8% in Grugliasco and 10.0% in Moncalieri, in 2008 it scored 5.6% in Ivrea and 5.9% in Orbassano.

In the 2008 general election Portas was elected to the Chamber of Deputies as an independent from the list of the Democratic Party in the "Piedmont 1" constituency, marking the party's entry in national politics.

In 2009 provincial elections the party won 2.7% in the Province of Turin, 2.1% in Alessandria, 1.7% in Cuneo and 0.8% in Novara, and in that year municipal elections it obtained 10.4% in Nichelino and 6.7% in Piossasco.

In the 2010 regional election the Moderates won 3.1% of the vote regionally and 4.1% in the Province of Turin, where Michele Dell'Utri was elected regional councillor. After the election, Giovanni Maria Ferraris was appointed regional minister.

In the 2011 Turin municipal election the party garnered a sweeping 9.1% and four councillors, being crucial for the election of Democrat Piero Fassino as mayor.

In the 2012 municipal elections the party won 6.5% in Alessandria, 4.6% in Asti, 6.8% in Cuneo, and 11.9% in Grugliasco. Lists with a similar name and symbol appeared also outside Piedmont, most notably in Piacenza, where "Moderates for Dosi" won 13.4% of the vote.

The party contested the 2013 general election as part of the PD-led centre-left coalition Italy. Common Good and Portas was re-elected to the Chamber.

In the 2014 regional election the party obtained 2.5% of the vote and two councillors.

In 2015 Michelino Davico, a senator from Cuneo elected with Lega Nord, joined the party, which was thus represented in both houses of the Italian Parliament.

In 2016 the party formed a federative pact with Civic Choice (SC) and sub-group within the Mixed Group of the Chamber of Deputies with three deputies (Marco Di Lello, S&D–PD; Lello Di Gioia, S&D–PD; Aniello Formisano, IdV), but not its leader Portars, who remained in the group of the PD. In the 2016 local elections the Moderates won 5.9% in Turin, 10.0% in Pinerolo and 4.8% in Nichelino, and, outside Piedmont, no remarkable results (including a mere 0.9% in Naples).

In the 2017 local elections the party obtained 3.8% in Alessandria, 4.6% in Cuneo, and 7.4% in Chivasso.

The Moderates contested the 2018 general election as part of the centre-left coalition and Portas was elected in the PD list. 

In 2019 the Moderates ended their association with the Democratic Party and affiliated to Italia Viva, the new centrist party founded by former Prime Minister Matteo Renzi. Portas also left the PD group in the Chamber of Deputies and joined the IV group. 

The party competed in the 2020 Campania regional election in support of the candidate Vincenzo De Luca, getting 3.6% of the vote and 2 seats.

The party originally planned to contest the 2022 general election as a component of the Democratic Party – Democratic and Progressive Italy list.

References

External links
Official website

Political parties in Piedmont
Political parties established in 2006
Christian democratic parties in Italy